Pterolocera isogama is a moth of the Anthelidae family. It was described by Turner in 1931. It is found in Australia.

References

Moths described in 1931
Anthelidae